The 1985 Mercedes Cup, was a men's tennis tournament played on outdoor clay courts and held at the Tennis Club Weissenhof in Stuttgart, West Germany that was part of the 1985 Grand Prix circuit. It was the eighth edition of the tournament and was held from 9 September until 15 September 1985. First-seeded Ivan Lendl won the singles title.

Finals

Singles
 Ivan Lendl defeated  Brad Gilbert, 6–4, 6–0
 It was Lendl's 7th singles title of the year and the 49th of his career.

Doubles
 Ivan Lendl /  Tomáš Šmíd defeated  Andy Kohlberg /  João Soares, 3–6, 6–4, 6–2

References

External links
 Official website 
 ATP tournament profile
 ITF tournament edition details

Stuttgart Open
Stuttgart Open
Stuttgart Open
Stuttgart Open